Mater Suspiria Vision is a worldwide collective founded by producer, filmmaker and artist Cosmotropia de Xam. The band's debut release, Second Coming, was released on Disaro in February 2010. Mater Suspiria Vision are often recognized as pioneers of the witch house genre and visual aesthetics.

Discography

Studio albums
Second Coming
Crack Witch
Annodamonna - The Witch Album
π
House Of The Witches
Inverted Triangle I
Inverted Triangle II
Paracusia (Crack Witch 2)
Inverted Triangle III
Süsyphüs Concrëte
Serenity
Discoteca Droga (featuring Carmen Incarnadine)
Hollywood Necronomicon
Atem
Malacreanza
Surrealistica Uniferno
Serenity 2 (Stigmata Of Eden)
Antropophagus
Schwarze Messe Des Gehirns
Phantasmagoria
Hexensabbat

EPs/Singles
Exorcism Of The Hippies
Seduction Of The Armageddon Witches
Inside The Brain Of Miss Lennon's Tongue (featuring Crisne)
La Bocca È La Tana Del Bianco Coniglio (featuring Shivabel)
Il Labirinto Del Sesso EP
Fantasia 2 (split with How I Quit Crack and Pwin Teaks)
Antropophagus (The Giallo Disco Remixes)
Trauma I EP

Live recordings
Live In London (featuring Carmen Incarnadine)
Live In Milan (featuring Delila Muerte)
Live In Los Angeles

Compilations
Ultra Rare Trax
超レア·トラック (Ultra Rare Trax 2012)
Ultra Rare Trax III
Inverted Triangle I-III
The Singles 2010-2015

Other
On TV
Vogue Witch
Ghost Drone Remixes (collection of official remixes of Crossover)
Hoüse Öv Drüg: The Drüghoüse Tapes
Crack Witch (The Ghost Drone Remixes)
Droga 39
Paracusia Sessions
Split (split with fromrussiawithaids)
Tarot Box
Serenity Tour CDR
Zombie Rave
Seduction Of The Armageddon Witches
The ATEM Modifications
SPUK
Dysnomia

References 

German electronic music groups